Ogwo Ekeoma Ogwo commonly known as Ogwo E. Ogwo is a Nigerian Professor of marketing in the Abia State University Uturu. He was the Vice-Chancellor of Abia State University Uturu from September 2000 to September 2005. He is from Igbere in Bende local government area in Abia.

References 

Living people
1949 births
Nigerian male writers
Academic staff of Abia State University
Igbo academics
Vice-Chancellors of Abia State University Uturu